General elections were held in Peru on 11 October 1931 to elect the President and a Constitutional Congress. The result was a victory for Luis Miguel Sánchez Cerro of the Revolutionary Union, who received 50.8% of the vote.

Results

President
Sanchez Cerro was also supported by the Nationalist Social Party, Osores was supported by the Constitutional Party, the Labourist Party and the National Coalition Party, while Jara y Ureta was supported by the Decentralist Party and Popular Union.

Constitutional Congress
Twelve elected members of the Congress later had their election declared invalid, including eight from the APRA, two independents and one each from the National Coalition and Revolutionary Union.

References

1931 in Peru
Elections in Peru
Peru
Presidential elections in Peru
Election and referendum articles with incomplete results